This is a list of French television related events from 1973.

Events
6 March - Martine Clemenceau is selected to represent France at the 1973 Eurovision Song Contest with her song "Sans toi". She is selected to be the eighteenth French Eurovision entry during a national final held at the Buttes-Chaumont Studios in Paris.

Debuts
15 September - La Une est à vous (1973-1976, 1987–1994)

Television shows

1940s
Le Jour du Seigneur (1949–present)

1950s
Discorama
La Piste aux étoiles (1956-1978)
Présence protestante (1955-)

1960s
La Tête et les Jambes (1960-1978)
Les Coulisses de l'exploit (1961-1972)
Les Dossiers de l'écran (1967-1991)
Monsieur Cinéma (1967-1980)
Les Animaux du monde (1969-1990)
Alain Decaux raconte (1969-1987)
Télé-Philatélie

1970s
Aujourd'hui Madame (1970-1982)

Ending this year
Colorix (1967-1973)
Bonne nuit les petits13 December 1973

Births

Deaths

See also
1973 in France
List of French films of 1973